Hilary B. Price (born 1969) is an American cartoonist. She is known for creating the comic strip Rhymes with Orange, which is published digitally on her website and in over one hundred newspapers across the United States. At the age of 25 she became the youngest cartoonist to ever be nationally syndicated. She won the Silver Reuben for "Best Newspaper Panel Cartoon" from the National Cartoonists Society four times, in 2007 and 2009, 2012 and 2014.

Early life and career beginnings 
Price grew up in Weston, Massachusetts. She studied English at Stanford University. She originally had no intentions of becoming a cartoonist, but eventually began submitting strips to The New Yorker, without success. She was then hired as a freelance copywriter for an ad agency in San Francisco. Whilst there she submitted her comics to the San Francisco Chronicle, and they were published in the opinion and book review section. Her success at the Chronicle inspired her to begin submitting her work for syndication. In 1995, Price received a call from King Features Syndicate to request more samples of her work, and by June of that year she was syndicated. Price was just 25 years old at the time, which makes her the youngest cartoonist to achieve national syndication.

Work 
Price publishes her panels almost daily to her website named after her strip ("Rhymes with Orange"). The title is derived from the belief that no English word rhymes with orange.

Price's panels often feature animals such as cats and dogs in lieu of humans and don't feature any reoccurring characters.

Her strip's format is also unique in design. A typical Price comic features one long panel where the illustration and dialogue are found, and to the left is a smaller panel with the title of the strip and often a secondary punchline and smaller illustration. This setup has the reader going from right to left rather than the typical left to right found in most Western comics.

In addition to her website her work has also appeared in Parade Magazine, Funny Times, People and Glamour.

Price has released several compilations of her work in books, one of those being "Hanukkomics" in which she gathered all of her comics about Jewish culture and holidays.

Her inspirations for comics include "Dr. Seuss for the rhymes, Shel Silverstein for the clever word play and black-and-white illustrations, and The New Yorker cartoonists Roz Chast, Sam Gross and George Booth." But her main influence comes from greeting card artist Sandra Boynton. In the eighth grade, Price learned that Boynton, who she had assumed was a male, was in fact a female. This opened up the idea to Price that women could do "funny drawings" too.

Personal life 
Price is an openly gay, Jewish woman who lives in Florence, Massachusetts with her partner, dog, and cat. She plays ice hockey.

References 

Rhymes With Orange Creator Hilary Price Publishes Hanukkomics: Cartoons About Jewish Culture and Holidays
International Women's Day Hilary Price: Life through the eyes of a cartoonist
Hilary Price knows what Rhymes with Orange | CBR
'Rhymes with Orange' creator Hilary Price of Northampton wins newspaper award from National Cartoonists Society for 3rd time
Catching up with "Rhymes With Orange's" Hilary Price on the 15th anniversary of her national syndication | Jewish Women's Archive
The Cartoonists - Hilary B. Price, Creator of Rhymes With Orange

1969 births
Living people
People from Weston, Massachusetts
Artists from Massachusetts
American women cartoonists
Stanford University alumni
American LGBT artists
LGBT people from Massachusetts
LGBT Jews
Jewish American artists
American cartoonists
21st-century American Jews
21st-century American women
Inkpot Award winners